Music in PyeongChang(한국어:평창대관령음악제, Abbr.:MPyC), formerly Great Mountains Music Festival & School (한국어:대관령국제음악제), is one of South Korea's largest classical music festival held annually in PyeongChang, Korea. It was launched by Professor Hyo Kang of the Juilliard School in 2004 and is currently led by its artistic director and cellist Sung-Won Yang.

Programs 
Main Concert
Rising Star Series
Master Class
 Student Concert
Conversation with Artists
 Children's Concert

Venues 
The main venues for the performances are Alpensia Concert Hall and Alpensia Music Tent, both located in the Alpensia Resort in Pyeongchang, Gangwon Province of Korea. Alpensia Concert Hall was built in 2010 and seats nearly 600 people, which makes it more suitable for chamber music performances. The 1300-seat Music Tent was completed in 2012. Master classes and Student Recitals are carried out in Pyeongchang Hall, located within the first floor of Alpensia Convention Center.

Artistic Directors 
2004–2010: Hyo Kang
2011–2017: Myung-Wha Chung & Kyung-Wha Chung
2018-2022 : Yeol Eum Son
2023-Present : Sung-Won Yang

Themes 
The festival is programmed around a different theme each year.

World Premieres
The programs of Music in PyeongChang often feature premieres of pieces by major composers from Korea and abroad.
 2005 Behzad Ranjbaran:  Awakening
 2005 Jin Hi Kim:  One Sky
 2006 Sukhi Kang:  Pyeongchang Four Seasons for Violin solo and 14 strings
 2007 Gordon Shi-Wen Chin:  Haiku for voice and strings
 2008 Jay Greenberg: Four Scenes
 2012 Mikhail Fokine: Saint-Saëns - Le cygne from Le Carnival des animaux"The Dying Swan"
 2012 Younghi Pagh-Paan: Hang-Sang V
 2012 Younghi Pagh-Paan: Chohi and Her Imaginary Dance
 2013 Richard Danielpour: Songs of the Wandering Darveesh
 2013 Young Jo Lee: Mori for Cello, Daegum, and Percussion
 2014 Jeongkyu Park: Darkness into Light
 2015 Shinuh Lee: "Landscape" for 2 violins and viola
 2015 Thierry Escaich: sextet
 2016 Christopher Berg: Told Tales Sweet as Untold: Three Poems of Fernando Pessoa

See also

List of music festivals in South Korea
List of classical music festivals

References 

Music in PyeongChang Official Website (www.mpyc.kr/ )

External links
Music in PyeongChang website
Music in PyeongChang Facebook page
Music in PyeongChang Instagram
Music in PyeongChang YouTube Channel

Music festivals established in 2004
Chamber music festivals
Classical music festivals in South Korea
Music festivals in South Korea
Summer events in South Korea